Bani Amro is a sub-district located in the Al Haymah Ad Dakhiliyah District, Sana'a Governorate, Yemen. Bani Amro had a population of 6625 according to the 2004 census.

References 

Sub-districts in Al Haymah Ad Dakhiliyah District